Vicki Susan Buck (born 16 July 1955) is a New Zealand politician. She was Mayor of Christchurch for nine years from 1989 to 1998. She retired after three terms, having been very popular. She made a political comeback, standing in the 2013 local elections in the Riccarton-Wigram ward as councillor for Christchurch City Council, being returned with the highest number of votes across all city wards. She subsequently accepted the role of deputy mayor.

Early life and family
Buck was born on 16 July 1955, and educated at Christchurch Girls' High School. She went on to study at the University of Canterbury from 1972, graduating Bachelor of Arts in 1975 and Master of Arts with honours in political sciences in 1977. In 1986, she married Robert Donald McKay, but their marriage ended during Buck's time as Christchurch mayor.

Political life

Buck joined the Labour Party aged 16. She first stood for election in the October 1974 local elections. Aged 19, she was a Labour candidate in the Pegasus ward of Christchurch City Council. The ward, where four positions were contested by ten candidates, saw her come fifth, narrowly beaten by the fourth candidate but with a large margin to the sixth candidate. Based on the election night results, before special votes were counted, it had been thought that she might beat fellow Labour member Bill Massey, an incumbent councillor, who was just 65 votes ahead of her. Councillor Massey unexpectedly died in March 1975 and that triggered a by-election only because Christchurch had introduced the ward system for the 1974 election; prior to that, when 19 councillors were elected at large, seats had just been left vacant. The Labour Party chose Buck to stand in the by-election. Still just aged 19, Buck won the by-election on 10 May 1975 by a large margin. She was New Zealand's youngest city councillor at that time.

Despite her youth, she soon made an impact around the council table and attracted the attention of news media. A 1978 reshuffle of council committee chairmanships resulted in the proposal of Buck taking over the Community Services Committee, but this was blocked by Mayor Hamish Hay and his colleagues on the Citizens ticket. She was one of five Local Government Commissioners working from 1984 to 1989 on a major reorganisation of local government in New Zealand.

Buck became the city's first woman mayor in 1989. She stood for mayor as an independent. An active and vigorous leader, she is widely credited with leading a turnaround in the perception of Christchurch as a city.

In 1990, Buck received the New Zealand 1990 Commemoration Medal, and in 1993 she was awarded the New Zealand Suffrage Centennial Medal.

Her sister Sally Buck had been an elected councillor for Christchurch City Council since 1998, but retired from the city council in October 2013 after five terms.

Life after politics
More recently she has:
 been a member of the New Zealand government's Science and Innovation Advisory Council 
 been chair of the NZ Learning Discovery Trust, which in turn has set up Discovery 1 and Unlimited state schools in central Christchurch. The schools are based on the student being central in their own individual learning.
 initiated the LIFT Trust with five schools in Linwood to create free tertiary education for students who may otherwise not enjoy this because of the fees barrier.
 been director and co-founder of Aquaflow Bionomic Corporation, a bio-fuel company using wild algae, and cleaning dirty and contaminated water. 
 been director and co-founder  of Celsias.com, a website for business and community groups which is based on the premise that Governments are not acting quickly enough on climate change and it will be up to all of us to act.
 been director and co-founder of Carbonscape, aimed at sequestering carbon from waste biomass through microwave technology.
 been on the NZ advisory board of Craigmore Sustainables, involved in carbon forestry.

In 2008 she was nominated by a panel commissioned by The Guardian newspaper as one of 50 people who could reverse the effects of climate change.

Political comeback
Buck stood as an independent candidate in the 2013 local elections in the Riccarton-Wigram ward as councillor for Christchurch City Council. She supported Lianne Dalziel's mayoral campaign, although initially declined to become deputy mayor. On 12 October 2013, Buck was returned with the highest number of votes of any of the council candidates across the city. In late October, Buck changed her mind and decided to accept the role of deputy mayor, after the role was re-framed to include more than ceremonial duties. She served in this role until 2016.

In June 2019, she announced that she would not be seeking re-election in October.

References

External links

ICMI biographical note (Internet Archive)
NZ Windfarms biographical note

1955 births
Living people
Place of birth missing (living people)
People educated at Christchurch Girls' High School
University of Canterbury alumni
Mayors of Christchurch
Women mayors of places in New Zealand
Deputy mayors of Christchurch
Christchurch City Councillors
New Zealand Labour Party politicians
Recipients of the New Zealand Suffrage Centennial Medal 1993